The Honda Dream CB250 was a standard motorcycle made by Honda in 1968 and 1969 and sold only in Japan. It had a  air-cooled, parallel twin, SOHC, four-stroke with a claimed  at 10,500 rpm. It was Honda's first 250 cc capacity motorcycle with vertical cylinders and a 5-speed transmission.

History
The CB250 was created to replace the CB72 Hawk (the larger capacity Superhawk CB77 was replaced by the CB350). There was also an export version, named CB250 Super Sport. The main differences between the two versions were the style and colour of the fuel tank, head light, filter and suspension covers. The rare Japanese model, known as CB72 style, had a classic chromed silver tank and black covers while the popular export models, produced from 1968 to 1973, had a tank and covers finished in two toned candy colours.

Since the very first version, model code CB250 K0, Honda has produced many CB250 models. After the release of the revolutionary Honda CB750, the popularity of the CB250 helped Honda to become one of the world's top motorcycle producers.

Notes

Dream CB250
Police vehicles
Standard motorcycles
Motorcycles introduced in 1968
Motorcycles powered by straight-twin engines